The Kursiivi printing house arson took place in the early morning of 26 November 1977, destroying the printing house Kursiivi in Helsinki in Lauttasaari. Kursiivi printed the newspaper of the Taistoist wing of the Communist Party of Finland Tiedonantaja, the Swedish language communist newspaper Arbetartidningen Enhet and Finnish People's Democratic League youth wing's Pioneeritoveri. 

A homemade bomb was also found in the printing house, which, however, had not had time to explode. In addition, the exterior walls of the building had been defaced with swastikas. Police arrested a man suspected of setting fire on December 9. The left called on the state to take action against the far right because of the incident. The case and its litigation also attracted attention abroad.

Members of the neo-nazi party Patriotic People's Front were convicted of arson, including Pekka Siitoin, known as a neo-Nazi and occultist, party secretary Seppo Lehtonen, Timo Pekkala and two people from Kotka. In connection with the Kursiivi printing house arson lawsuit, Tiedonantaja magazine claimed that White Russian émigré Boris Popper had acted as a financier of Siitoin and acquired weapons and ammunition from the military's warehouses for the use of Siitoin's groups.

References

1977 crimes in Finland
Crime in Helsinki
Industrial fires
Building and structure fires in Europe
Neo-Nazism in Finland
Right-wing terrorist incidents
Terrorist incidents in Finland
Lauttasaari
Terrorist incidents in Europe in 1977